The 2012–13 season was the 99th season of competitive association football played by Plymouth Argyle Football Club, an English team based in Plymouth. The season was the club's 86th in the Football League and seventh in the fourth tier of the English football league system.

Match details

Football League Two

FA Cup

Football League Cup

Football League Trophy

Squad statistics
Appearances and goals are sourced from Soccerbase. For a description of playing positions, see association football positions.

Transfers

In

 Brackets around club names indicate the player's contract with that club had expired before he joined Plymouth Argyle.

Out

Loans in

Loans out

See also
List of Plymouth Argyle F.C. seasons

References

Plymouth Argyle F.C. seasons
Plymouth Argyle